Big Brother Portugal is the Portuguese version of the international reality television franchise Big Brother, produced by Endemol for Portuguese channel TVI. TVI launched the show in 2000. Since its beginning, it has been a great success.

The show had seven editions with three being celebrity versions (Big Brother Famosos 1, Big Brother Famosos 2 and Big Brother VIP), presented by Teresa Guilherme. The popularity of this show steadily declined until TVI canceled after the fourth season in 2003.

In 2010, TVI aired the first season of Secret Story - Casa dos Segredos franchise. The show based on the original French version of Secret Story.

In 2013, after 11 years, TVI aired the third celebrity version of Big Brother, titled Big Brother VIP.

In 2020, TVI brought Big Brother to life to his first civilian series since 2003. During this new season, the show had a quarantine phase at the beginning, called BB ZOOM, where every housemate had to be isolated in one hotel room due to COVID-19. The contestants had to pass two negative tests to enter the Big Brother house.

After the end of Big Brother 2020, the network renewed the show for a sixth season calling it Big Brother: Revolution starting in September 2020 with its original host Teresa Guilherme.

Season chronology

Series overview

Regular version

Celebrity version

Spin-off version

Presenters and programmes

Records

Highest number of rejections

Ratings

The house
The house used during the first four seasons was located in a Studio Complex in Venda do Pinheiro, in the municipality of Mafra. In the fifth season, the house moved to a previously existing mansion known as "Kasa do Futuro", near Ericeira.

Big Brother 1
The first season of Big Brother began on 3 September 2000 and finished 120 days later on 31 December 2000. The winner of reality show was Zé Maria.

In 2014, the season was re-aired in +TVI, a cable channel from TVI.

Housemates

Nominations

Big Brother 2
The second season of Big Brother began on 21 January 2001 and finished 120 days later, 20 May 2001. The winner of reality show was Henrique (Icas).

Housemates

Nominations

Big Brother 3
The third season of Big Brother started on 2 September 2001 and finished 121 days later, 31 December 2001. The winner of reality show was Catarina. The first woman to win Big Brother Portugal.

Housemates

Nominations

Big Brother Famosos 1
Big Brother Famosos 1 is the first celebrity version of Big Brother. The show started on 8 September 2002 and finished on 4 November 2002, it lasted 58 days with the housemate Ricky emerging the winner.

Housemates

Nominations

Notes:
 In round one of nominations each housemate had to vote to evict another housemate.

Big Brother Famosos 2
Big Brother Famosos 2 is the second celebrity version of Big Brother. The show started on 4 November 2002 and finished on 31 December 2002, it lasted 58 days with the housemate Vítor emerging the winner.

Housemates

Nominations

Notes:
 In round four of nominations all female housemates were immune from eviction.

Big Brother 4
The fourth season of Big Brother began on 31 August 2003 and finished 120 days later, 31 December 2003. The winner of reality show was Fernando (Nando). The grand cash prize was 100,000 Euro.

Housemates

Nominations

  Housemate was Head of House
  Housemate was automatically nominated by the Head of House

Big Brother VIP
Big Brother VIP was the third celebrity version of Big Brother, and the first in Portugal to use the name Big Brother VIP. The show started on 21 April 2013 and finished on 21 July 2013, lasted 92 days. Pedro Guedes emerging the winner.

Big Brother 2021
The seventh season of Big Brother. The show started on 12 September 2021 and finished on 31 December 2021, lasted 111 days. Ana Barbosa emerging the winner.

Housemates

Nominations table

Notes

Nominations total received

Big Brother Famosos 2022 I 
Big Brother Famosos 2022 I is the fourth celebrity version of Big Brother, coming back after a nine-year break. The show started on 2 January 2022 with the presentation of Cristina Ferreira.

Housemates

Nominations table 

 Notes

Big Brother Famosos 2022 II

Housemates

Nominations table 

 Notes

Big Brother: Desafio Final

Housemates

Nomination table 

Notes

Big Brother 2022
The eighth season of Big Brother started airing on 11 September 2022 and finished on 31 December 2022, lasting 112 days.

Housemates

Duos

Nominations table

Notes

   On Day 1, Ricardo answered the Big Phone and had to nominate automatically one person. He chose Miguel.
   On Day 1, Diana chose one duo to be split. She chose Miro & Joana T. and decided to stay with Miro. Due to that, Joana T. won immunity for being the only player without a teammate.
   On Day 4, Miro & Diana won the Sun and, hence, the opportunity to give immunity to one contestant on Sunday. They chose Cátia (which ended up with no effect because she became the Leader).
   On Day 8, Frederica & Nuno were automatically nominated due to disrespectful behavior, in the case of not being eliminated (because they were up to vote for the first week).
   On Day 8, Miguel & Catarina were successful in their mission and had to nominate automatically someone. They chose Ana.
   On Day 12, Miguel answered the Big Phone and was automatically nominated for the following round of nominations.
   On Day 15, after Ana got eliminated, a twist was revealed: another housemate would leave that evening. Mafalda, Frederica, and Catarina, for being saved by the viewers against Ana, are immune to this round. For the first time, the nominations were made individually.
   On Day 22, 5 new housemates entered the house. Without knowing, all of them are up to vote in a separate round, and one of them leaves on Day 26.
   On Day 22, Juliana had to nominate automatically one housemate. She chose Mafalda.
   On Day 22, Patrícia had to give one nomination in advance and gave it to Diana. Also, Jéssica had to choose one housemate to leave the game. She chose Diana; however, it was a fake eviction. Diana went to a Secret Room and returned 24 hours later. Hence, Patrícia's extra nomination didn't affect the nominations.
   On Day 23, after returning to the House, Diana had to nominate automatically one housemate. She chose Bernardo.
   On Day 23, Diana also gave a poisoned gift. She gave it to Frederica. On Day 29, Big Brother announced the gift: unable to nominate (voided).
   On Day 29, the house was split into 2 groups: the oldies (housemates since Day 1) and the fresh (new housemates). Host Cristina Ferreira allowed everyone to switch groups. Bernardo switched to the oldies, and Frederica and Miguel switched to the fresh. Only one group had the chance to become the Leader of the House, chosen by the viewers. The fresh won and Diogo C. won the Leader competition.
  On Day 29, the nominations suffered a slight modification: every player makes 3 nominations, but at least one of them needs to be necessary for somebody in the group that player belongs. Cátia and Jéssica changed their vote after the voting time, so their votes were nullified.
  On Day 34, Joana S. received the opportunity to assign 2 consequences: to choose somebody to start the next nominations with 2 votes in advance and to choose somebody whose received nominations would count twice. She chose Rúben C. for the first twist and Miro for the second. On Day 36, Rúben C. walked and Miro was automatically nominated. Joana S. chose Bernardo for the first consequence and Patrícia for the second.
   On Day 36, new housemates, Bárbara and Sónia, had to nominate automatically the contestant they think is the quietest in the game. They chose Miro.
   On Day 36, Diogo M. received a dilemma: to keep Mafalda as his teammate, he would be automatically nominated; if he chose to change his teammate, he could choose either one of the new housemates (Bárbara and Sónia) to pair up with. He chose to keep his duo and became automatically nominated.
  On Day 36, for having won the Sun, Frederica and Diogo C. had 1 more vote in this round.
  On Day 45, Miguel was punished for bad behavior towards Catarina. He ceased to be a Leader of the House.
   On Day 50, all the survivors from Week 8's nominations (Bárbara, Diogo C., Jéssica, and Patrícia) were immune.
   On Day 57, Rúben B. pushed the "courage button" and had the opportunity to nominate automatically one housemate (except Diana and Diogo M., who were still up to vote). He chose Bárbara, who also had the opportunity to nominate someone (except the two mentioned earlier and Rúben B.). She chose Sónia.
  On Day 57, Bernardo wrongly nominated Tatiana (who was immune from being the Leader of the House), so his nomination was ignored.
  On Day 57, two players were tied with 4 votes (Patrícia and Joana). They both faced a flash vote, and Patrícia won with 65%, being saved from nomination.
   On Day 64, after Joana S. got eliminated, it was revealed that another housemate would leave that evening. Mafalda and Sónia, for being saved by the viewers against Joana S., are immune to this round.
   On Day 64, as her last mission as Leader, Tatiana had to spin a roulette that had all the contestants' faces. Oddly enough, the roulette stopped in her face and she had to choose one out of two envelopes. She chose one that ordered her to automatically nominate someone; she nominated Patrícia.
   On Day 64, as Bernardo was the first one saved from the nominations against Diana and Patrícia, he had to choose the one he expected to be evicted, and he chose Patrícia. If the audience evicted Patrícia, he would win immunity, while if Diana was evicted, he would be automatically nominated. Diana was evicted and Bernardo got automatically nominated.
   On Day 71, the public was given a chance to automatically nominate one housemate between Jéssica, Sónia, and Tatiana. As Tatiana was evicted, only the other two housemates were against the public vote and Jéssica received the most votes to be nominated.
    On Day 78, as Week 11's survivors from eviction, Bernardo, Diogo C., Jéssica, and Sónia faced a dilemma each. They had to choose between two options without knowing the consequences of each option. In sum, Bernardo gave 2 extra nominations to himself, Diogo C. immediately gave one nomination in advance (which was to Bárbara), Jéssica gave herself an automatic nomination and immunity to Patrícia, and Sónia received immunity.
  On Day 78, as a reward for the Sun task, Miro gave double votes to one housemate.
   On Day 85, before Week 11's eviction, the housemates were asked to nominate someone in advance. Miro received the most votes; however, there was a twist. Miro was not nominated and rather received immunity.
   On Day 85, the Leader Rúben B. faced a dilemma and chose between three boxes. The box he chose ordered him to pick a housemate to open one of the other two boxes. Rúben B. chose Diogo C. and the box he opened had an automatic nomination.
   On Day 92, the housemates voted for who they believed was the most worthy of being a finalist; Miguel received the most votes. Hence, Miguel faced a dilemma: he could accept or refuse to choose between two boxes, one containing a passport to the final and the other having an automatic nomination. Miguel accepted the dilemma and chose one of the boxes. The one he chose contained the automatic nomination.

Nominations total received

References

External links
Official website on TVI

 
Portuguese-language television shows
2000 Portuguese television series debuts
2003 Portuguese television series endings
2000s Portuguese television series